"Georgia on a Fast Train" (originally titled "I Been to Georgia on a Fast Train") is a song by Billy Joe Shaver from his debut 1973 album Old Five and Dimers Like Me.

Released as a single that year, it peaked at number 88 on U.S. Billboards country chart.

In 1994, Shaver released this song as a single again, that time under the shortened title "Georgia on a Fast Train". The new version did not chart.

Charts

Johnny Cash version 

Johhny Cash covered the song on his Jack Clement–produced 1982 album The Adventures of Johnny Cash. Released as the first of three singles from it, his version reached number 55 on U.S. Billboard country chart for the week of September 4, 1982.

Track listing

Charts

References

External links 
 "Georgia on a Fast Train" on the Johnny Cash official website

Billy Joe Shaver songs
Johnny Cash songs
1973 songs
1973 singles
1982 singles
1994 singles
Songs written by Billy Joe Shaver
Song recordings produced by Jack Clement
Columbia Records singles